The Serbian Astronomical Journal is a biannual peer-reviewed scientific journal covering astronomy. The journal is the successor of the Bulletin Astronomique de Belgrade (1992–1998), which was formed by a merger of the Bulletin de l'Observatoire Astronomique de Belgrade (1936–1991) and the Publications of the Department of Astronomy (1969–1990). It has been published under the present title since 1998. It is published by the Astronomical Observatory Belgrade and the Department of Astronomy (Faculty of Mathematics, University of Belgrade). It publishes invited reviews, original scientific papers, preliminary reports, and professional papers over the entire range of astronomy, astrophysics, astrobiology, and related fields.

Abstracting and indexing 
The Serbian Astronomical Journal is abstracted and indexed by Astrophysics Data System, Chemical Abstracts, Referativni Zhurnal, EBSCO databases, Scopus and Thomson Reuters products

References

External links 
 

Astronomy journals
University of Belgrade academic journals
English-language journals
Biannual journals
Publications established in 1936
Journal
1936 establishments in Serbia